The following is a timeline of the history of the city of Modena in the Emilia-Romagna region of Italy.

Prior to 18th century

 218 BCE – .
 193 BCE – Battle of Mutina (193 BC) fought near town.
 187 BCE – Via Aemilia built, passing through Mutina.
 183 BCE – Mutina becomes "seat of a Roman colony."
 78 BCE – Mutina besieged by forces of Pompey during the Roman civil wars.
 44 BCE – War of Mutina begins.
 43 BCE – Battle of Mutina fought in vicinity of town.
 312 CE – Roman Catholic diocese of Modena established (approximate date).
 7th C. CE – Citta Geminiana established near Modena.
 872 – Leodoino becomes bishop.
 1054 – Eriberto becomes bishop.
 1099 – Modena Cathedral construction begins.
 1175 - University of Modena founded.
 1179 - Torre della Ghirlandina (Cathedral bell tower) set up.
 1184 – Modena Cathedral consecrated.
 1288 – Obizzo II d'Este in power; Este rule continues until 1796.
 1325 – Modenese forces fight the Bolognese in the Battle of Zappolino.
 1336 - House of Este in power.
 1338 - University of Modena closes.
 1348 – Black Death plague outbreak.
 1452 – Duchy of Modena and Reggio established.
 1474 – Printing press in operation.
 1476 – San Pietro church construction begins.
 1598 – Biblioteca Estense (library) relocated to Modena from Ferrara.
 1634 – Ducal Palace of Modena construction begins.
 1663 - Sant'Agostino church refurbished.
 1671 – June: Earthquake.
 1677 – Demetrio Degni starts publishing its weekly gazette named Modona, it lasted until 1701
 1680 –  founded.
 1683 – University of Modena reestablished.

18th–19th centuries
 1703 – August: City occupied by French troops.
 1707 – February: French troops depart.
 1734 – July: City occupied by French troops.
 1736 – May: French troops depart.
 1742 – June: City occupied by Austrian troops.
 1749 – February: Austrian troops depart.
 1749 – 14 August: first issue of the newspaper Il Messaggiere, which lasted till 1859
 1762 – Grande Ospedale Civile (hospital) built.
 1771 – Grande Albergo dei Poveri (poorhouse) built.
 1772 - University of Modena and Reggio Emilia re-established.
 1797 – Modena becomes part of the French client Cisalpine Republic.
 1815 – Military Academy of Modena active.
 1816 – Fortifications dismantled.
 1841 – Teatro Comunale Modena opens.
 1859
 Francis V, Duke of Modena deposed.
 Modena railway station opens.
 1860 – Modena becomes part of the Kingdom of Sardinia.
 1872 –  begins operating.
 1873 –  built.
 1877 – Il Cittadino newspaper begins publication.
 1879 – Modena Cathedral interior restored .
 1881 –  begins operating, with horsecars
 1888 – Teatro Storchi (theatre) built.
 1893 –  begins operating.
 1897 – Population: 67,658.

20th century

 1906 - Population: 66,762. 
 1911 – Population: 70,923.
 1912
 Electric  begin operating.
 Modena F.C. (football club) formed.
 1913 – Cinema Scala built.
 1915 – Cinema Metropol built.
 1916 –  (railway) begins operating.
 1920 – Modena railway station rebuilt.
 1931
  (market) opens.
 Population: 92,757.
 1936 – Stadio Alberto Braglia (stadium) opens.
 1941 – AMCM (transit entity) formed.
 1950
 Trolleybus system begins operating.
 Modena Autodrome racetrack opens.
 1963 –  (health clinic) established.
 1966 – November: Flood.
 1967 – "Superachitettura" exhibit held.
 1970 – Biblioteca civica Antonio Delfini (library) established.
 1971 –  opens.
 1972 – September: Flood.
 1981 – Gazzetta di Modena newspaper begins publication.
 1996 – 15 October: Earthquake.(it)

21st century

 2001 –  (transit entity) established.
 2012 – May: Northern Italy earthquake sequence.
 2013 – Population: 179,353.
 2014
 Flood.(it)
 Gian Carlo Muzzarelli becomes mayor.

See also
 
 List of mayors of Modena
 List of bishops of Modena
 List of dukes of Ferrara and of Modena, 1452–1859
  (state archives)
 

Timelines of other cities in the macroregion of Northeast Italy:(it)
 Emilia-Romagna region: Timeline of Bologna; Ferrara; Forlì; Parma; Piacenza; Ravenna; Reggio Emilia; Rimini
 Friuli-Venezia Giulia region: Timeline of Trieste
 Trentino-South Tyrol region: Timeline of Trento
 Veneto region: Timeline of Padua; Treviso; Venice; Verona; Vicenza

References

This article incorporates information from the Italian Wikipedia.

Bibliography

in English
 
 
 
 
 
 
  (+ 1870 ed.)

in Italian
 
 
 
 
  1899–1902 (3 volumes)

External links

  (city archives)
 Items related to Modena, various dates (via Europeana)
 Items related to Modena, various dates (via Digital Public Library of America)

Modena
Modena
History of Modena